Up from the Bottomless Pit and Other Stories is an original collection featuring a novel and other short literary works by American  science fiction author Philip José Farmer, edited by Christopher Paul Carey, published in 2007. All of the works in the book written by Farmer previously appeared in the periodical Farmerphile: The Magazine of Philip José Farmer between the years 2005 and 2007. The collection   includes several mainstream stories by Farmer, who is better known for his science fiction work.

Contents
"Introduction: Philip José Farmer: On the Road to the Emerald City" by Christopher Paul Carey
Up from the Bottomless Pit (novel)
"That Great Spanish Author, Ernesto"
"The Essence of the Poison"
"Keep Your Mouth Shut"
"The Face That Launched a Thousand Eggs"
"The Doll Game"
"The Rebels Unthawed"
"The Frames"
"The Light-Hog Incident"
"The Unnaturals"
"A Spy in the U.S. of Gonococcia"
"A Peoria Night"
"I Still Live!"
"Hayy ibn Yaqzam by Abu ibn Tufayl: An Arabic Mowgli"
"Why Do I Write?"

Notes

Sources
 Carey, Christopher Paul. (2007) "Introduction: Philip José Farmer: On the Road to the Emerald City" in Up from the Bottomless Pit and Other Stories by Philip José Farmer, Burton, MI: Subterranean Press.

External links 

 SF Site review of Up from the Bottomless Pit and Other Stories
 Green Man Review review of Up from the Bottomless Pit and Other Stories
 Entry for Up from the Bottomless Pit and Other Stories at Philip José Farmer International Bibliography

Novels by Philip José Farmer
2007 short story collections
Science fiction short story collections
Subterranean Press books